One World (Czech: Jeden svět) is the largest human rights film festival in the world (125,947 spectators in 2018), held annually in Prague and other 36 cities of the Czech Republic, with a selection later shown in Brussels and other countries. The festival highlights quality documentary films on social, political, environmental, media and human rights issues. One World presents over a 100 documentary films from all around the globe and organizes numerous Q&As with filmmakers and experts.

History 
Established in 1999 by Igor Blaževič and the Czech NGO People in Need, the One World Festival presents over a100 documentary films during nine days in Spring from around the world. It is a founding member of the Human Rights Film Network, which brings together 33 festivals around the world.

In 2006, the festival received a Special Mention from UNESCO for its contribution to human rights and peace education. Three years later, in 2009, One World published a handbook entitled Setting Up a Human Rights Film Festival, which offers practical advice as well as case studies of prominent human rights events.

In 2018, the One World Festival was in its 20th year and took place from 5–14 March, presenting 128 documentaries and 9 virtual reality projects from more than 40 countries around the world. In the same year, the festival and the NGO, People In Need, published the handbook, Explore Impact: How To Reach New Audiences And Boost impact, that should serve as an important guideline for the festival (or other cultural events) organizers who care about the social dimension and impact of their work. 

One World was held under the auspices of Václav Havel, the Minister of Foreign Affairs Karel Schwarzenberg, the Minister of Culture Jiří Besser, and the Mayor of Prague Bohuslav Svoboda.

The 2020 edition of the festival was postponed due to rising concerns over COVID-19 coronavirus outbreak.

Competitions and awards

One World's program consists of three competitive categories, a variety of non-competitive thematic categories as well as Docs for Kids section. Films are judged by One World's selection committee that concentrates equally on both human rights content and artistic quality. Six main awards are given to the winning films:

International Competition Award
Award for the Best Director in the International Competition
The Václav Havel Jury Award for a film that makes an exceptional contribution to the defense of human rights
Czech Competition Award
Audience Award
Student Jury Award

Homo Homini Award
During the festival, People in Need grants the annual Homo Homini Award to individuals in recognition of their dedication to promoting human rights, democracy and nonviolent solutions to political conflicts. The 2011 award went to the underground network of Syrian doctors, Doctors Coordinate of Damascus, for their work in aiding victims of violence in Syria.

Winners of the Homo Homini Award 
1994: Sergei Kovalev
1997: Szeto Wah
1998: Ibrahim Rugova
1999: Oswaldo Payá Sardiñas
2000: Min Ko Naing
2001: Zackie Achmat
2002: Thích Huyền Quang, Thích Quảng Độ and Nguyễn Văn Lý
2003: Nataša Kandić
2004: Gheorghe Briceag
2005: Ales Bialatski and the Belarusian organisation Viasna
2006: Svetlana Gannushkina
2007: Su Su Nway, Phyu Phyu Thin, and Nilar Thein
2008: Liu Xiaobo
2009: Majid Tavakoli and Abdollah Momeni
2010: Azimjan Askarov
2011: Doctors Coordinate of Damascus
2012: Intigam Aliyev
2013: Sapiyat Magomedova
2014: Souad Nawfal
2015: Black Spring (Cuba): Martha Beatriz Roque Cabello, Jorge Olivera Castillo, Ángel Juan Moya Acosta, José Daniel Ferrer García, Félix Navarro Rodríguez, Iván Hernández Carrillo, Héctor Maseda Gutiérrez, Óscar Elías Biscet González, Eduardo Díaz Fleitas, Librado Ricardo Linares García, Arnaldo Ramos Lauzurique
2016: Committee for the Prevention of Torture (Russia)
2017: Pham Doan Trang
2018: Francisca Ramirez
2019: Buzurgmehr Yorov
2020: Marfa Rabkova, Andrei Chapiuk, Leanid Sudalenka, and Tatsiana Lasitsa
2021: Mahienour El-Massry

See also
 Designblok

References

External links
One World Film Festival Official Site
 At Prague Festival, Movies With a Conscience in: The New York Times
 Movies and Prizes 2011

Festivals in Prague
Documentary film festivals in the Czech Republic
Film festivals in Prague
Human rights film festivals
Film festivals established in 1999
Spring (season) events in the Czech Republic
1999 establishments in the Czech Republic